Novy Shugan (Yañı Şıwğan) is a rural locality (a village) in Mikhaylovsky Selsoviet, Bakalinsky District, Bashkortostan, Russia. The population was 124 as of 2010. There are 3 streets.

Geography 
Novy Shugan is located 24 km south of Bakaly (the district's administrative centre) by road. Mikhaylovka is the nearest rural locality.

References 

Rural localities in Bakalinsky District